Keelan Sexton (born 1997) is a boxer and a Gaelic footballer who plays for the Kilmurry Ibrickane club and at senior level for the Clare county team.

He did his Leaving Cert at Ennistymon CBS in 2016. He turned 19 in July 2016 and was already in his second season on the senior panel.

He played county minor, under-21 and senior in the same season.

Keelan grew up in West Clare and played underage hurling for Clare and was going to be with Bohemians in the League of Ireland; He was a student at the University of Limerick. His grandfather Martin Burke was a boxer in London during the 1960s and 1970s and Keelan took after him first before turning to the Gaelic football, winning three national titles representing the West Clare boxing club and two national titles afterwards when he represented the Ennis boxing club, representing Ireland in the Schoolboy Championships and getting a bronze medal there and a gold medal at the North European Championships.

He was a Sigerson Cup player when in Limerick.

As of 2022, he was studying for a master's degree in law at Trinity College Dublin.

He was top scorer in a single game in the 2022 All-Ireland Senior Football Championship.

He first played for Donegal Boston in 2019.

References

External links

1997 births
Living people
Clare inter-county Gaelic footballers
Donegal Boston Gaelic footballers
Gaelic footballers who switched code
Irish expatriate sportspeople in the United States
Irish male boxers
Kilmurry Ibrickane Gaelic footballers